Lyubov Ivanivna Odynokova-Berezhnaya (née Berezhnaya, born July 24, 1955) is a former Soviet/Ukrainian handball player who competed in the 1976 Summer Olympics and in the 1980 Summer Olympics.

In 1976 she won the gold medal with the Soviet team. She played all five matches and scored nine goals.

Four years later she was a member of the Soviet team which won the gold medal again. She played all five matches and scored 16 goals.

External links
profile

1955 births
Living people
Soviet female handball players
Russian female handball players
Ukrainian female handball players
Handball players at the 1976 Summer Olympics
Handball players at the 1980 Summer Olympics
Olympic handball players of the Soviet Union
Olympic gold medalists for the Soviet Union
Olympic medalists in handball
Medalists at the 1980 Summer Olympics
Medalists at the 1976 Summer Olympics